Old Cambrians Sports Club is a former first-class cricket team in Sri Lanka. 

Old Cambrians competed in the Sri Lankan first-class competition in 1989-90 and 1991-92. Of their 14 matches they won one, lost five and drew eight. They played their home matches at Tyronne Fernando Stadium, Moratuwa. They continue to compete at sub-first-class levels.

See also
 List of Sri Lankan cricket teams

References

External links
 Old Cambrians Sports Club at CricketArchive

Former senior cricket clubs of Sri Lanka